Wayne S. Vucinich (June 23, 1913 – April 21, 2005) was an American historian. Following World War II, he was one of the founders of Russian, Slavic, East European and Byzantine studies at Stanford University, where he spent his entire academic career.

Life
Vucinich was born in the United States to a family of Serb immigrants who had come from Bosnia in the early twentieth century. He was born in Butte, Montana in 1913, and lived there until he was orphaned at 5 years old and then sent back to Herzegovina.

He was educated in Herzegovina and Los Angeles, California. He attended the University of California, Berkeley, earning a M.A. in East European history in 1936. He continued to pursue his doctoral studies between 1936 and 1941, also studying at Charles University in Prague.

Career
After graduating, Vucinich joined the Office of Strategic Services (OSS) and worked as an analyst for the Balkans and the Soviet Union during the Second World War. In the course of his assignments, he visited London, Bari and Sofia. In 1946, after working in the State Department for a year, he accepted an offer to teach in Stanford's History Department, where he worked until his formal retirement in 1978.

From 1972-85, he was director of the Center for Russian and Eastern European Studies. He also taught at Stanford's overseas campuses in Florence, Beutelsbach and Vienna. In 1977, he was appointed as Robert and Florence McDonnell Professor of Eastern European Studies at Stanford, a chair first established for Vucinich. He held it for many years after his formal retirement in 1978. Among his students were David Kennedy and Norman Naimark.

In his teaching and research, Vucinich covered a broad area of history, encompassing general European history, modern history, history of the Austro-Hungarian Empire, Italy, the Balkans, Ottoman and Byzantine history, and nationalities of the Soviet Union. From 1981-82, he served as president of the American Association for the Advancement of Slavic Studies.

Legacy and honors
In 1954, Vucinich won the George Louis Beer Prize of the American Historical Association for his Serbia Between East and West: The Events of 1903-08.
1982, the Vucinich Book Prize was established in his honor by the American Association for the Advancement of Slavic Studies.  The Wayne S. Vucinich Book Prize is awarded annually for the most important contribution to Russian, Eurasian, and East European studies in any discipline of the humanities or social sciences published in English in the United States in the previous calendar year.
In 1989, Vucinich and Jozo Tomasevich received the Distinguished Contributions to Slavic Studies Award from the Association for Slavic, East European, and Eurasian Studies.

Selected works 

 Serbian foreign policy 1903-1909. Thesis (M.A.), University of California, Berkeley 1936.
 Serbian foreign policy, 1903-1908. Thesis (Ph.D.) University of California, Berkeley 1941.
 The Second World War and beyond. 1949.
 Yugoslavs of the Moslem faith. 1949.
 "Postwar Yugoslav Historiography," The Journal of Modern History Vol. 23, No. 1, March 1951
 Serbia between East and West; the events of 1903-1908. Stanford University Press, Stanford 1954.
 "The Yugoslav Lands in the Ottoman Period: Postwar Marxist Interpretations of Indigenous and Ottoman Institutions," The Journal of Modern History Vol. 27, No. 3, September 1955
 Yugoslavs in California. Los Angeles 1960.
 The Ottoman Empire, its record and legacy. Van Nostrand, Princeton, N.J. 1965.
 The peasant in nineteenth-century Russia: a conference on the Russian peasant in the nineteenth century. Stanford 1966.
 Contemporary Yugoslavia; twenty years of Socialist experiment. (With Jozo Tomasevich; Stanford University.; et al.) University of California Press, Berkeley 1969.
 Russia and Asia; essays on the influence of Russia on the Asian peoples. Hoover Institution Press, Stanford University, Stanford, Calif. ©1972.
 Eastern Europe. Ginn, Lexington, Mass. 1973.
 Croatian illyrism; its background and genesis. 1975.
 A study in social survival: the katun in Bileća Rudine. University of Denver, Graduate School of International Studies, Denver ©1975.
 Nation and ideology: essays in honour of Wayne S. Vucinich. (With Ivo Banac.) East European monographs, Boulder; Columbia U.P. (distr.) New York, 1981.
 The First Serbian uprising, 1804-1813. Social Science Monographs; New York. Distributed by Columbia University Press, Boulder 1982.
 At the brink of war and peace: the Tito-Stalin split in a historic perspective. Social Science Monographs, Brooklyn College Press, New York. Distributed by Columbia University Press, 1982.
 Kosovo: legacy of a medieval battle. (With Thomas Allan Emmert.) University of Minnesota, Minneapolis, Minn. 1991.
 Ivo Andric revisited: the bridge still stands. International and Area Studies, Berkeley, ©1995.
 Memoirs of my childhood in Yugoslavia. (With Larry Wolff.) Society for the Promotion of Science and Scholarship, Palo Alto, Calif. ©2007.

References

1913 births
2005 deaths
American Byzantinists
20th-century American educators
20th-century American historians
American male non-fiction writers
American people of Serbian descent
Historians of the Balkans
People from Butte, Montana
Stanford University Department of History faculty
Scholars of Byzantine history
20th-century American male writers